TBank (formerly Aspis Bank - ) was a commercial bank in Greece. Its headquarters were in Athens and it had 72 branches across Greece as of September 2008. The bank was being traded on the Athens Stock Exchange.

Aspis Bank was rebranded as TBank on 20 July 2010, following its acquisition by TT Hellenic Postbank 

In 2013, the Eurobank Group acquired “New TT Hellenic Postbank S.A”. The operational merger of New TT Hellenic Postbank was completed in May 2014, with the integration of former T Bank systems.

External links
 Official Website

References

Defunct banks of Greece
Companies formerly listed on the Athens Exchange
Greek companies established in 1992
Banks established in 1992

fr:Liste d'entreprises grecques